Pakistan sent a delegation to compete at the 1992 Summer Paralympics in Barcelona, Spain. It was the country's first ever participation at any of these Games. It sent two athletes,  Khawar Malik, a swimmer and Khalid Mahmood a discus thrower.

References 

Nations at the 1992 Summer Paralympics
1992
Summer Paralympics